Michael A. Johnson Jr. (born 1986) is an American serial killer who murdered at least four women in Chicago's South Side between 2008 and 2010. Johnson, despite being born with a deformity in his right hand, strangled each of the women to death. After failing to kill a fifth victim, who later pinpointed him to police, Johnson was arrested and sentenced to 100 years imprisonment on one count of murder in 2015.

Early life 

Johnson was born in South Side, Chicago in 1986. He was born missing three fingers from his right hand, which is possibly because of his mother's heavy use of drugs while she was pregnant. When he was 5 years old, his father left the family, leaving Johnson and his six other siblings in the hand of his mother who often neglected them. His mother also regularly beat Johnson with electrical cords and barred him along with his siblings from leaving the house. Due to this, she would not let any of them attend high school. The family struggled financially so as a way of work his mother resorted to prostitution, while Johnson would often travel to the corner store to beg for food.

Johnson met Tena Anderson at a friend's birthday in 2006. The two dived into a relationship and a year later Anderson delivered Johnson's baby. In April 2008 Johnson was granted work at FedEx, but due to him struggling financially he became homeless and was subsequently laid off from work.

Murders 

A few months after being laid off, Johnson met a 43-year-old sex worker at a gas station, and he was able to convince her to agree to have sex for money. The two voyaged to a foreclosed home Johnson once lived in. The two had sex but the woman refused to go on when Johnson requested a certain sex act. The refusal caused Johnson to be thrown into rage and attacked the women, choking her until she lost consciousness, then sexually assaulted her and threw her off the second story balcony. He then dragged her unconscious body to an alleyway where he left her for dead. The woman survived but suffered a collapsed lung, lacerated liver and permanent scars all over her back.

Two months later, in November 2008 Johnson attacked another woman, 38-year-old Eureka Jackson, whom he strangled and who died as a result. He discarded her body in a boarded up building on the border in the West Pullman neighborhood. She was found with her shirt tied to her neck which was also tied to a closet door handle. Johnson then took a year-long hiatus. In January 2010 Johnson struck again, when he strangled Leslie Brown to death, and dumped her dead body at 119th and Wentworth, where it was found frozen and nude by a passerby. 

In March, Johnson attacked Candice Franklin in the neighborhood of Roseland. He choked her until she was unconscious, raped her, and left her for dead. She later awoke with a swollen eye and a bloodied face, but survived from her injuries. Later that same month, Johnson strangled 30-year-old Siobhan "Shay" Hampton to death, later discarding her body near Harold's Chicken Shack. In May Johnson killed his final victim, 29-year-old Lutelda Hudson, who was also strangled.

Arrest 

Later in May, Franklin had recovered from her injuries and returned to prostitution as a way to make money. While out on the streets, she noticed Johnson, and knew he was the one who attacked her. She quickly ran away, but Johnson followed. When Franklin made it to her boyfriend's home, Johnson retreated. Coincidently, a few weeks later, she noticed Johnson on the street again. This time she called her boyfriend who arrived and confronted Johnson. Police quickly arrived and arrested Johnson; a swab of his DNA was taken, and it matched to DNA found at the crime scene, proving his guilt. Apparently, police had already been looking for Johnson after his DNA was matched to three of the four murders he committed, and DNA soon linked him to the fourth. He was charged with the four murders and the attempted murder of Franklin.

Trial and imprisonment 

Johnson was convicted of the attack on Franklin in March 2014 and sentenced to 90 years imprisonment. The following year he was sentenced to 100 years imprisonment for the murder of Brown. As of now, Johnson has yet to be tried for the other three murders, but it is possible that he is not going to be tried for them due to his current 90 year and 100-year sentence, adding up to a total of 190 years for Johnson to serve in prison.

See also 
 List of serial killers in the United States

References 

1986 births
21st-century American criminals
American male criminals
American people convicted of attempted murder
American people convicted of murder
American rapists
American serial killers
Crime in Chicago
Crimes against sex workers in the United States
Criminals from Chicago
Living people
Male serial killers
People convicted of murder by Illinois
Prisoners sentenced to life imprisonment by Illinois
Violence against women in the United States